Shuichi Sekiya (born 11 June 1969) is a Japanese biathlete. He competed in the men's sprint event at the 1998 Winter Olympics.

References

1969 births
Living people
Japanese male biathletes
Olympic biathletes of Japan
Biathletes at the 1998 Winter Olympics
Sportspeople from Niigata Prefecture